Averara is a comune in the province of Bergamo, in Lombardy, Italy. It is one of the smallest and least populated comunes in the province of Bergamo.

It is surrounded by the following comuni:  Bema, Albaredo per San Marco, Mezzoldo, Olmo al Brembo, Santa Brigida and Gerola Alta.

Coat of arms
The coat of arms of Averara shows two brick towers and a golden eagle.

References

External links
Business site with information on Averara in English
Averara in Italian

Cities and towns in Lombardy